Trailing Double Trouble is a 1940 American Western film directed by S. Roy Luby and written by George H. Plympton and Oliver Drake. The film is the second in Monogram Pictures' "Range Busters" series, and it stars Ray "Crash" Corrigan as Crash, John "Dusty" King as Dusty and Max "Alibi" Terhune as Alibi, with Lita Conway, Nancy Louise King and Roy Barcroft. The film was released on October 10, 1940, by Monogram Pictures.

Plot
The Range Busters chase a group of outlaws shooting at the occupant of a wagon. When the outlaws flee the Range Busters discover the wagon's driver is dead but there is a live baby in the wagon. They discover that the villains are trying to abduct the child to get their hands on a valuable piece of property.

Cast
Ray "Crash" Corrigan as 'Crash' Corrigan 
John 'Dusty' King as Dusty King
Max Terhune as 'Alibi' Terhune 
Lita Conway as Marion Horner
Nancy Louise King as The Baby
Roy Barcroft as Jim Moreland
Jack Rutherford as Amos Hardy
Tom London as Kirk
William Kellogg as Walt
Carl Mathews as Drag
Forrest Taylor as Sheriff
Kenne Duncan as Bob Horner 
Rex Felker as Rope Twirler

See also
The Range Busters series:

 The Range Busters (1940)
 Trailing Double Trouble (1940)
 West of Pinto Basin (1940)
 Trail of the Silver Spurs (1941)
 The Kid's Last Ride (1941)
 Tumbledown Ranch in Arizona (1941)
 Wrangler's Roost (1941)
 Fugitive Valley (1941)
 Saddle Mountain Roundup (1941)
 Tonto Basin Outlaws (1941)
 Underground Rustlers (1941)
 Thunder River Feud (1942)
 Rock River Renegades (1942)
 Boot Hill Bandits (1942)
 Texas Trouble Shooters (1942)
 Arizona Stage Coach (1942)
 Texas to Bataan (1942)
 Trail Riders (1942)
 Two Fisted Justice (1943)
 Haunted Ranch (1943)
 Land of Hunted Men (1943)
 Cowboy Commandos (1943)
 Black Market Rustlers (1943)
 Bullets and Saddles (1943)

References

External links
 

1940 films
1940s English-language films
American Western (genre) films
1940 Western (genre) films
Monogram Pictures films
American black-and-white films
Films directed by S. Roy Luby
Films about babies
Films with screenplays by George H. Plympton
Range Busters
1940s American films